Wang Wenyuan (February, 1931 – June 16, 2014) was a Chinese male politician, who served as the vice chairperson of the Chinese People's Political Consultative Conference.

References 

1931 births
2014 deaths
Vice Chairpersons of the National Committee of the Chinese People's Political Consultative Conference